Anterior gradient protein 3 homolog is a protein that in humans is encoded by the AGR3 gene.

References

External links

Further reading 

 
 
 

Endoplasmic reticulum resident proteins